Revista del Museo Argentino de Ciencias Naturales is a peer-reviewed natural sciences journal published by the Museo Argentino de Ciencias Naturales (Argentine Museum of Natural Sciences). This journal is a merger of all subseries of: Revista del Museo Argentino de Ciencias Naturales "Bernardino Rivadavia" e Instituto Nacional de Investigación de las Ciencias Naturales, and all subseries of: Comunicaciones del Museo Argentino de Ciencias Naturales "Bernardino Rivadavia" e Instituto Nacional de Investigación de las Ciencias Naturales.

References 

Paleontology journals
Geology of Argentina
Magazines published in Argentina
Publications established in 1999